Agostino Pinelli Ardimenti (Genoa, 1492 - Genoa, 1566) was the 59th Doge of the Republic of Genoa.

Biography 
Agostino Ardimenti was elected to the dogal title on January 4, 1555, the fourteenth in two-year succession and the ninety-ninth in republican history. After his mandate ended on January 4, 1557 he was appointed perpetual procurator by the supreme syndicators. Ardimenti died in Genoa in an attack in 1566, assassinated for an exchange of person by an assassin who had the task of killing the doge Luca Spinola. The instigator of the murder was Giovanni Stefano Lercari, son of the doge Lercari, as revenge against Luca Spinola for the alleged offenses suffered by his father after a speech in the Senate.

See also 

 Republic of Genoa
 Doge of Genoa

References 

16th-century Doges of Genoa
1492 births
1566 deaths